Big Lagoon is the southernmost and largest of three similar lagoons within Humboldt Lagoons State Park, along the coast of Humboldt County, California.

It is located between Trinidad to the south and Orick at the mouth of Redwood Creek to the north.

The lagoons are shallow bays between rocky headlands where coastal wave action has formed a sandy bar separating each lagoon from the Pacific Ocean. The lagoons are resting areas for migratory waterfowl using the Pacific Flyway between Lake Earl on the Smith River estuarine wetlands  to the north and Humboldt Bay on the Mad River estuarine wetlands  to the south.

Geology
Big Lagoon is similar to other coastal features of northern California including Humboldt Bay to the south and Lake Earl to the north; an alluvial plain is surrounded by steep uplands. Hills adjacent to Big Lagoon have been identified as the Franciscan Assemblage along the eastern shore and Pleistocene dune sandstone to the south.   Studies around Humboldt Bay indicate tectonic activity along the Cascadia subduction zone has caused local sea level changes at intervals of several centuries. The plain may support fresh water wetlands or Sitka Spruce forests following uplift events and salt marsh or inundated shellfish beds following subsidence events. At the present lagoon level, the sand bar normally separates the lagoon from the ocean during summer months. Winter precipitation may raise the water level in the lagoon a few meters above sea level. Hydrostatic pressure and storm surf may then breach the sand bar allowing the lagoon to drain into the sea and then receive tidal inflow until wave action reforms the bar.

History
Roosevelt elk graze the wetlands south of the lagoon and may sometimes be seen where U.S. Route 101 crosses the lagoon. Hammond Lumber Company Plant Three included 20th century company housing and a sawmill log pond built where Maple Creek enters the south end of Big Lagoon. The coastal portion of Big Lagoon was used as an aerial rocket range by the United States Navy during World War II. Canoe access to Big Lagoon is available from a park on the south shore near the community of Big Lagoon and Big Lagoon Rancheria.

See also
Freshwater Lagoon
Stone Lagoon

References

Lagoons of California
Bodies of water of Humboldt County, California
Estuaries of California
Wetlands of California
Lagoons of Humboldt County, California